Garry St. Leger (born July 24, 1985) is a judoka from United States.

References
 
 US Judo
 Facebook

American male judoka
Living people
1985 births
Place of birth missing (living people)